Coliseo del Boulevard is an indoor arena in Junín, Argentina.  It is primarily used for basketball and is the home arena of the Ciclista.  It holds 2,000 people.

Indoor arenas in Argentina
Basketball venues in Argentina